Faustino "Bojie" Dy III (born 31 August 1961) is a Filipino politician from Isabela. He is currently serves as the Vice Governor of Isabela since 2019. He previously served as the Governor of Isabela from 2010 to 2019.

References 

https://www.manilatimes.net/2022/05/11/news/regions/dy-albano-clans-remain-strong-in-isabela/1843175/amp

Filipino politicians
Governors of Isabela (province)
Living people
1961 births